The Forward Trust is a British charity that helps people with drug and alcohol dependence. Previously known as RAPt (the Rehabilitation for Addicted Prisoners Trust), it was relaunched in 2017 as Forward Trust after merging with Blue Sky organization.

RAPt delivers services both in the criminal justice system and in community settings. Approximately 20,000 people every year use a RAPt service. RAPt is the only provider of drug treatment programmes within HM Prison Service that has verifiable evidence of effectiveness.

History

RAPt was established in 1991 as the Addicted Diseases Trust when Peter Bond, a recovering alcoholic, observed the success of abstinence-based programmes in the United States. He, Jonathan Wallace and Michael Meakin, set up a charity to meet the needs of drug addicts in UK prisons.

In 1992 RAPt opened the first intensive drug rehabilitation programme in a UK prison in a Portakabin at HMP Downview in Surrey. The actor Sir Anthony Hopkins, an early supporter, provided much-needed funds and remains a patron.

Catherine, Duchess of Cambridge, a patron of the charity, delivered the keynote speech at the launch of the charity's 2021 Taking Action on Addiction campaign.

See also
Alcoholism
Drug abuse
Drug addiction
Drug rehabilitation
12-step programme

References

External links
 
 Article, The Times 
 Article, Hull Daily Mail 
 RAPt/ PNC Research most recent research
 Drug Treatment In Prison: An Evaluation of the RAPt Treatment Programme - a two-year study into the effectiveness of the RAPt treatment programme.

Addiction organisations in the United Kingdom
Non-profit organisations based in the United Kingdom